Čížek (feminine Čížková) is a Czech surname, meaning siskin. Notable people include:
 František Čížek known as Franz Cižek (1865–1946), Czech-Austrian painter known as a teacher and reformer of art education
 Karel Čížek, Czech rower
 Katerina Cizek, Canadian filmmaker
 Martin Čížek, Czech footballer
 Roy Cizek, American inventor
 Tomáš Čížek, Czech footballer
 Václav Čížek, Czech ice hockey player
 Zuzana Čížková, Czech sculptor and painter

See also
 
 Czyż, Polish surname

Czech-language surnames
Given names